Lyubov Lyadova (born 17 November 1952) is a former Soviet cross-country skier who competed during the early 1980s. She won a silver medal in the 4 × 5 km relay at the 1982 FIS Nordic World Ski Championships in Oslo and finished fourth in the 20 km event at those same championships.

Lyadova also won the 10 km event at the 1983 Holmenkollen ski festival. Her best individual finish at the Winter Olympics was seventh in the 20 km event at Sarajevo in 1984.

Cross-country skiing results
All results are sourced from the International Ski Federation (FIS).

Olympic Games

World Championships
 1 medal – (1 silver)

World Cup

Season standings

Team podiums

 1 podium

Note:   Until the 1999 World Championships, World Championship races were included in the World Cup scoring system.

References

External links

 

1952 births
Living people
Soviet female cross-country skiers
Olympic cross-country skiers of the Soviet Union
Cross-country skiers at the 1984 Winter Olympics
Holmenkollen Ski Festival winners
FIS Nordic World Ski Championships medalists in cross-country skiing